The Roland S-STOL is a German STOL ultralight and light-sport aircraft, produced by Roland Aircraft. The aircraft is supplied as a kit for amateur construction or as a complete ready-to-fly-aircraft.

Design and development
The aircraft was designed to comply with the Fédération Aéronautique Internationale microlight rules and US light-sport aircraft rules. It features a strut-braced high-wing, a two-seats-in-side-by-side configuration enclosed cockpit accessed via doors, fixed tricycle landing gear and a single engine in tractor configuration.

The aircraft is made from sheet aluminum. Its  span wing has an area of  leading edge slots and flaps. The wing is supported by V-struts with jury struts. The standard engine available is the  Rotax 912UL four-stroke powerplant. The S-STOL can be de-rigged for storage and folding wings are a factory option. The aircraft can be fitted with wheels, skis and floats and can be used to tow gliders and hang gliders.

Operational history
Reviewer Marino Boric described the design in a 2015 review saying, "high reliability, robustness and real short-field ability make it a good-natured aircraft with forgiving characteristics both in the air and on the ground, where
its robust undercarriage, high ground clearance and tundra tires help it cope with the roughest strips."

Specifications (S-STOL)

See also
Zenith STOL CH 701

References

External links

2000s German ultralight aircraft
Homebuilt aircraft
Light-sport aircraft
S-STOL
Single-engined tractor aircraft
High-wing aircraft